Social balance theory is a class of theories about balance or imbalance of sentiment relation in dyadic or triadic relations with social network theory. Sentiments can result in the emergence of two groups.  Disliking exists between the two subgroups within liking agents.

Development of the theory
This theory evolved over time to produce models more closely resembling real-world social networks.  It uses a balance index to measure the effect of local balance on that of a global level and also on a more intimate level, like in interpersonal relationships. Dorwin Cartwright and Frank Harary introduced clustering to account for multiple social cliques.  Davis introduced hierarchical clustering to account for asymmetric relations.

Recent research indicated that hubness in positive and negative subnetworks increases the balance of the signed network.

See also
 Balance theory
 Sociograms

References

Social networks
Sociological theories
Further Readings